Romanivka is a village in Ukraine. It is part of Bashtanka Raion of Mykolaiv Oblast. It belongs to Bereznehuvate settlement hromada, one of the hromadas of Ukraine.

Romanivka is the site of an ancient mega-settlement belonging to the Cucuteni–Trypillia culture dating to 3600-3200 BC. The settlement was for the time very large, covering an area of 100 hectares. This proto-city is just one of 2,440 Cucuteni-Trypillia settlements discovered so far in Romania, Moldova and Ukraine. 194 (8%) of these settlements had an area of more than 10 hectares between 5000-2700 B.C. and more than 29 settlements had an area in the range of 100 to 450 hectares.

Until 18 July 2020, Romanivka belonged to Bereznehuvate Raion. The raion was abolished that day as part of the administrative reform of Ukraine, which reduced the number of raions of Mykolaiv Oblast to four. The area of Bereznehuvate Raion was merged into Bashtanka Raion.

History 

Romanivka was formed after a merger of Big Romanivka and Little Romanivka . It is and always was a predominantly Jewish settlement. Around 1886, many Jews of Kherson moved here. At that time, Romanivka had a population of 1476. The town was made up of 83 households and four synagogues and Jewish schools.

References

Villages in Bashtanka Raion
Khersonsky Uyezd
Former Jewish agricultural colonies of Kherson Governorate